The Roman Catholic Diocese of La Guaira is a diocese located in the city of La Guaira in the Ecclesiastical province of Caracas in Venezuela.

History
On 15 April 1970 Pope Paul VI established the Diocese of La Guaira from the Metropolitan Archdiocese of Caracas.

Bishops

Ordinaries
Marcial Augusto Ramírez Ponce (1970.04.15 – 1972.12.05), appointed Auxiliary Bishop of Caracas, Santiago de Venezuela
Francisco de Guruceaga Iturriza (1973.10.02 – 2001.10.18)
José de la Trinidad Valera Angulo (2001.10.18 – 2011.10.12), appointed Bishop of Guanare
Raúl Biord Castillo, S.D.B. (2013.11.30 - )

Coadjutor bishop
Rafael Ramón Conde Alfonzo (1997-1999), did not succeed to see; appointed Bishop of Margarita

Other priest of this diocese who became bishop
Ricardo Aldo Barreto Cairo, appointed Auxiliary Bishop of Caracas, Santiago de Venezuela in 2019

See also
 Roman Catholicism in Venezuela

References

External links
 GCatholic.org
 Catholic Hierarchy 

Roman Catholic dioceses in Venezuela
Roman Catholic Ecclesiastical Province of Caracas, Santiago de Venezuela
Christian organizations established in 1970
Roman Catholic dioceses and prelatures established in the 20th century
1970 establishments in Venezuela
La Guaira